Filyovsky Park District is a district of Western Administrative Okrug of the federal city of Moscow, Russia. The district is 6.5 km west of the center of the city, and its northern and eastern borders are the Moskva River. Located in the area are the Khrunichev State Research and Production Space Center, Church of the Intercession at Fili, Gorbunov Palace of Culture and Filevsky Park. Population: ,

See also
Fili (Moscow)

References

Districts of Moscow